"" is the official anthem of the autonomous community of Asturias, in Spain.

This adaptation of a much slower song from the neighbouring lands of Cantabria ("") was appointed as official anthem after a contest in Oviedo in the 1890s. It has both a Castilian (Spanish) and an Asturian version.  It is also a popular melody for bagpipers.

In the mid-2000s, it was discovered that the first song lyrics were written in Cuba. The father of the author had returned to his beloved Asturias to die, the author—Ignacio Piñeiro—dedicated the song to his father. The music was different; it is believed to be a melody that Upper Silesian miners from the area of Opole Silesia—that worked in Asturian coal mines at the beginning of the 20th century—had brought to Asturias. In fact, the song is still known in Poland, where it used to be taught as a patriotic song (with the lyrics brought back by Polish brigadistas).

A few versions of the anthem were created by the Republican side of the Spanish Civil War, therefore the anthem was seen as a miners song (it is said the miners' revolt in Asturias in 1934 was a wake-up call to the civil war) and as a left-wing song by right-wing people.

Lyrics

Below are the lyrics from the version sung during the Asturian miners' strike of 1934.

See also
 Anthems of the autonomous communities of Spain

References

 Fernando de la Puente documents Asturian anthem history in Asturies.com (in Asturian)
 Asturian Newspaper La Nueva España reports on news about anthem history (in Spanish).

Spanish anthems
Regional songs
Asturian culture
Spanish-language songs
Anthems of non-sovereign states
Drinking songs